Callum Leander William McNish (born 25 May 1992 in Oxford) is an English footballer who plays for Didcot Town as a midfielder.

Club career
McNish began his football career at Watford playing left midfield. Former Saints scout Malcolm Elias then brought Callum to the Saints Academy to play at Under 12's level and he has continued to rise through the ranks.

He was named on the substitutes bench for the first time at Nottingham Forest on the last day of the 2008–09 season, however he was an unused substitute.

He made his debut on 24 April 2010, in a 3–2 victory over Carlisle United, but was released by the club in May 2011 following the club's promotion back to The Championship.

McNish signed for Exeter City on 26 July 2011 after a successful trial which impressed manager Paul Tisdale in Exeter City's pre-season friendlies, scoring two goals. His wages to be paid by the supporters via The 1931 Fund, whose members pay a minimum subscription every month. On 6 August 2011, McNish was named in the substitutes bench in an Exeter City match against League Two promoter Stevenage which was 0–0 but McNish was not used. On 9 August 2011, McNish made his debut for the club in a 2–0 win over Yeovil Town. On 13 August 2011, McNish made his league debut for the club in a 2–0 loss against Milton Keynes Dons where he made his first start before being taken off for Tom Nichols. On 31 March 2012, McNish made a start and played 90 minutes as Exeter drew 1–1 against Colchester United and also received a first yellow card in his professional career. However, McNish struggled to break into the Exeter line-up and failed to make a breakthrough. At the end of season, Exeter City were relegated from League One after three years in English football's third tier.

McNish was released by Exeter City on 15 May 2012 after not being offered a new contract by boss Paul Tisdale. McNish made just seven appearances including two starts for Exeter City. On 4 July, he signed a one-year contract with Braintree Town.

After a spell with Conference North side Oxford City, McNish joined North Leigh in summer 2014.

In 2016, McNish moved to Didcot Town.

References

External links
Profile

English footballers
1992 births
Living people
Southampton F.C. players
Exeter City F.C. players
Braintree Town F.C. players
Eastleigh F.C. players
Basingstoke Town F.C. players
Oxford City F.C. players
North Leigh F.C. players
Didcot Town F.C. players
English Football League players
Association football midfielders